Nosa Iyobosa Edokpolor (born 22 September 1996) is a Nigerian professional footballer who plays as a left-back for Austrian Football Bundesliga club Rheindorf Altach.

Club career

Early career
Iyobosa Edokpolor began his career with SV Glanegg, before moving to the youth academy of FC St. Veit in 2006. In April 2012, he made his senior debut for the first team of St. Veit in the fourth-tier Kärntner Liga. In the 2011–12 season he made to a total of three league appearances. In the 2012–13 season, he made 15 appearances in the fourth division. In May 2014, he scored his first goal in a 5–2 defeat against SC Landskron.

Ahead of the 2014–15 season, Iyobosa Edokpolor moved to Italy, where he joined the youth setup of the Palermo on loan. Playing for the U19 team, he made six appearances in the Campionato Primavera.

Wolfsberger AC II
Ahead of the 2015–16 season, Iyobosa Edokpolor returned to Austria and moved to the third-tier second team of Wolfsberger AC. In July 2015, he made his debut in the Austrian Regionalliga against Annabichler SV. In the 2015–16 season he made 27 Regionalliga appearances, with the second team of the Carinthian side, who suffered relegation to the Landesliga at the end of the season.

SV Horn
In June 2016, Iyobosa Edokpolor signed a two-year contract with recently promoted 2. Liga club SV Horn. His debut in the second division followed in August 2016, when he came off the bench in injury time for Ferdinand Weinwurm on the sixth matchday of that season against SC Wiener Neustadt. By the end of the season, he had made ten appearances in the second division, from which he was relegated with Horn. After relegation, he scored his first Regionalliga goal in April 2018 in a 2–0 win against SC-ESV Parndorf. In the 2017–18 season, he was utilised in all 31 league games, as Horn were able to win promotion to the 2. Liga once again.

Blau-Weiß Linz
After regaining promotion with Horn, Iyobosa Edokpolor moved to league rivals Blau-Weiß Linz for the 2018–19 season. In October 2018, he scored his first goal in professional football in a 6–3 victory against Austria Wien II. In his first season with the team, he made 29 second division appearances. After a further 23 appearances in the 2019–20 season, his contract was terminated in July 2020 due to disciplinary problems. Iyobosa Edokpolor had previously refused a substitution against his former club Horn on matchday 26, and not showed up for team practice the following day.

Rheindorf Altach
On 10 July 2020, Iyobosa Edokpolor signed with Austrian Football Bundesliga club Rheindorf Altach.

References

External links
 

1996 births
Living people
Sportspeople from Benin City
Nigerian footballers
Austrian footballers
Nigerian emigrants to Austria
Austrian people of Nigerian descent
Palermo F.C. players
SV Horn players
FC Blau-Weiß Linz players
SC Rheindorf Altach players
Austrian Football Bundesliga players
2. Liga (Austria) players
Association football defenders